Marko Erstić (born 26 May 1984) is a Croatian handball player.

He played for nine years in RK Zamet. He has also played for RK Mladi Rudar and RK Crikvenica.

With RK Zamet he got to the Croatian Handball Cup final in 2001.

External links
Eurohandball profile

References

1984 births
Living people
Croatian male handball players
RK Zamet players
RK Crikvenica players
Handball players from Rijeka